Elisabeth of Saxony (18 October 1552, at Wolkenstein Castle in Wolkenstein – 2 April 1590, in Heidelberg) was a Saxon princess, and Countess Palatine of Simmern by marriage to John Casimir of the Palatinate-Simmern.

Life 
Elisabeth was a daughter of the Elector August of Saxony (1526–1586) from his marriage to Anna (1532–1585), daughter of King  Christian III of Denmark.

She married on 4 June 1570 in Heidelberg during the Diet of Speyer with Count Palatine John Casimir of Simmern (1543–1592).  August opposed the policies of John Casimir, who was a Calvinist and friendly to France.  With this marriage, August hoped to woo  John Casimir over to the Lutheran side.  However, he did not succeed.  The Catholics in Germany regarded the marriage as a provocation against the Habsburg dynasty and an attempt to form a united Protestant front.

The Calvinist Johann Casimir tried to break the religious opposition of his Lutheran wife.  In October 1585, she was arrested and accused of adultery and a murder plot against her husband.  Even her brother, Elector Christian I, was convinced of her guilt.  She converted to Calvinism while in captivity, and died shortly afterwards.

Marriage and issue 
From her marriage with John Casimir, Elizabeth had the following children:
 Unnamed son (1573)
 Marie (1576–1577)
 Elisabeth (1578–1580)
 Dorothea (1581–1631), married in 1595 Prince John George I of Anhalt-Dessau (1598–1618)
 Unnamed daughter (1584)
 Unnamed  daughter (1585)

Ancestors

Royal descendants 

 The current reigning monarchs King Charles III of the United Kingdom, King Carl XVI Gustaf of Sweden, King Juan Carlos I of Spain, King Harald V of Norway, Willem-Alexander of the Netherlands, Queen Margrethe II of Denmark, King Albert II of Belgium and Grand Duke Henri of Luxembourg are all her direct-line descendants.

References 
 
 
 Karl von Weber: Archiv für die sächsische Geschichte, p. 215
 Bayerische Akademie der Wissenschaften: Die letzten Jahre der Pfalzgräfin Elisabeth, Proceedings of the III Cl., 1873, 1879
 

Duchesses of Saxony
House of Wettin
House of Palatinate-Simmern
1552 births
1590 deaths
16th-century German people
Albertine branch
Burials at the Church of the Holy Spirit, Heidelberg
Daughters of monarchs